Spillane is an album by American composer and saxophonist/multi-instrumentalist John Zorn, composed of three "file-card pieces", as well as a work for voice, string quartet and turntables.

It is named after mystery writer Mickey Spillane, whose novels featuring detective Mike Hammer provided the basis for the album's title track. Zorn wrote Spillane on a series of index cards, each containing an outline or instruction for the musicians that was intended to evoke scenes from one of Spillane's novels. One card states: "Scene of the crime #1 -- high harp harmonics, basses and trombone drone, guitar sonorities, sounds of water dripping and narration on top." Thus, the musicians are not given traditional sheet music, but a series of cues or outlines that encourage improvisation.

Zorn later released the composition "Spillane" on the compilation album Godard/Spillane (1999).

Reception
The Allmusic review by Stephen Cook awarded the album 4½ stars stating "Spillane is not only one of the highlights in Zorn's catalog, but also makes for a fine introduction to the composer's vast body of work".

Track listing

Personnel
1 - "Spillane" (25:12)
Recorded (June/August 1986) and Mixed (August 1987) by Don Hünerberg at NBC Radio City Studios, New York City
Written and arranged by John Zorn in collaboration with:
Anthony Coleman - piano, organ, celeste
Carol Emanuel - harp
Bill Frisell - guitar
David Hofstra - bass, tuba
Bob James - tapes, compact discs
Bobby Previte - drums, percussion
Jim Staley - trombone
David Weinstein - sampling keyboards
John Zorn - alto saxophone, clarinet
John Lurie - voice of Mike Hammer
Robert Quine - voice of Mike Hammer's conscience
Original texts by Arto Lindsay (and uncredited vocals)

"Two-Lane Highway" (18:16)
2 - Preacher Man/White Line Fever/Nacogdoches Gumbo/East Texas Freezeout/San Angelo Release/Rollin' to Killeen/Blowout/Devil's Highway/Midnight Standoff/Marchin' for Abilene (13:30)
3 - Hico Killer/Long Mile to Houston (4:46)
Recorded (June 1987) and mixed (August 1987) by Don Hünerberg at NBC Radio City Studios, New York City
Conceived and arranged by John Zorn for Albert Collins in collaboration with:
Albert Collins - guitar, voice
Robert Quine - guitar
Big John Patton - organ
Wayne Horvitz - piano, keyboards
Melvin Gibbs - bass
Ronald Shannon Jackson - drums
Bobby Previte - drums, percussion

4 - "Forbidden Fruit" (Variations for Voice, String Quartet and Turntables) (10:20)
Recorded September 1987 at Russian Hill Recording, San Francisco, by Howard Johnston, and at Metal Box Studio, Tokyo by Ono Seigen. Mixed September 1987 by Ono Seigen at CBS Roppongi Studios, Tokyo.
Written and arranged by John Zorn in collaboration with:
Kronos Quartet
David Harrington - violin
John Sherba - violin
Hank Dutt - viola
Joan Jeanrenaud - cello
Christian Marclay - turntables
Hiromi Ōta - voice
Original texts by Reck

Credits
Produced by John Zorn
Two-Lane Highway produced by John Zorn and David Breskin
Mastering: Robert C. Ludwig
Art direction and design: Carin Goldberg
Executive Producer: Robert Hurwitz
Thanks to David Breskin, Yale Evelev, Peter Clancy, Jennifer Keats, David Bither, Bruce Iglauer, Hilton Weinberg, Andy Haas, Kondo Toshinori, Azuma Eiichi, The Shifting Foundation
Albert Collins appears courtesy of Alligator Records
Visit Hip's Road in Harajuku, Tokyo, Japan

References

1987 albums
Albums produced by John Zorn
John Zorn albums
Nonesuch Records albums